The County-City Building is a  high-rise in downtown South Bend, Indiana. It houses the offices of the County Health Department, Council, and Board of Commissioners, as well as the South Bend Mayor’s Office, City Clerk’s Office, and  City Council chambers.

Construction & Design
Built in 1971, the building features an  International style of architecture with tinted windows and silver columns running the height of the tower.

Tenants
The building is currently occupied by the offices of  St. Joseph County and the  City of South Bend.

Voting
The building hosts a polling location for school board, city, county, state, and federal elections.

Clinic
After waning demand for the COVID-19 vaccine, all county-wide vaccination operations were moved to the lobby of the building. Tickets to Notre Dame football home games are being offered as an incentive to get the shot.

Location
Within downtown, it is adjacent it the Farmers Security Bank building, which is a historic landmark, the Second St. Joseph County Courthouse, and the Third St. Joseph County Courthouse.

References

Buildings and structures in South Bend, Indiana
1971 establishments in Indiana